Ferrymead Bays is a semi-professional association football club based in Christchurch, New Zealand. They compete in the Mainland Premier League
and they have won the league title on five occasions. Ferrymead Bays FC play their home games at Ferrymead Park in Ferrymead and Barnett Park in Redcliffs, Christchurch.

The club colours are navy blue and white. Their club crest takes elements of the local suburbs and bays, featuring a football on waves. The club’s main rival is Cashmere Technical due to the club's close proximity and other recent rivals include Coastal Spirit.

The club nickname is "The Bays", a reference to the club's several bays and coastal landmarks around that part of the city the club is located. The club crest first featured "Ferrymead Bays Soccer" around the ball and changed to "Ferrymead Bays Football" due to the modern reference to game's name.

History 

The Club was formed in 1972 by a group of six enthusiasts. By 1986 the Club typically entered 8 to 10 teams in the Canterbury Junior Football Assn Competitions, compared to the 42 teams we now have plus about 100 children in the beginners group.

Prior to 1997, the "A" teams in each grade normally played in Section 2 and often would win that section. However, it was rare for the "A" teams to stay in Section 1. This has changed after 1997 and a number of "A" teams have played in Section 1 for extended periods.

The increase in playing numbers and competitiveness has been due mostly to the continued housing development in the area and the introduction of the beginners group in 1990. Developing the football skills at an early age appears to have had flow-on benefits both in terms of playing numbers and competitiveness.

The Club has had the use of one senior pitch at Barnett Park from the outset. The junior pitches at Redcliffs Park and McCormacks Bay ten years ago left a lot to be desired – they were uneven with ponds! The City Council has made dramatic improvements to McCormacks Bay Park over recent years and we are grateful for this work.

Hockey used to have two pitches at Barnett Park but these were used less as more hockey games were played on artificial surfaces at Porritt Park. With the expansion in soccer teams, there was a need for more home grounds and the CCC agreed we could have full use of Barnett Park which now has two senior, two junior and one intermediate pitches. The consolidation at Barnett Park was helped by installing the practice lights in 1996 which have been a great asset.

The Club started out as Bays United AFC but the name was expanded to include Ferrymead to identify with the rapid expanding commercial area and its sponsorship opportunities plus to give a geographical location and avoid the confusion where some thought Bays meant Banks Peninsula Bays and included Akaroa! Bays reached the top in 2002 with the First Team winning the Mainland Premier League having won promotion from division 1 the year before.

Bays 1sts also won the Mainland Premier League for a second time when they were victorious in 2006. During the 2011 and 2012 season campaigns Ferrymead Bays won the league title on both occasions and again in 2017.

2012 season
During the 2012 season the club won four pieces of silverware including the Mainland Premier League, English Cup, South Island Football Championship and the Hurley Shield making the club the most successful in Christchurch in terms of Mainland Premier League titles.

2013 season
The 2013 season saw Ferrymead Bays looking for a hat-trick of Mainland Premier League titles. The season finished with Ferrymead Bays coming in 3rd place as local rivals Cashmere Technical won the title with a total of 49 points and Nelson Suburbs finishing second with 41 points. Ferrymead Bays did however manage to retain the English Cup title beating rivals Coastal Spirit 2-1 in the final at ASB Park. Goals came from golden boot Russell Kamo and James O'Sullivan with goalkeeper Adam Highfield being awarded Man of the Match in the final. 2013 would also mark the end of coach Mick Braithwaite's successful tenure at the club. He had made the suggestion of going into retirement in the later half of the season to a number of individuals at the club.

2014 season
Prior to the 2014 Mainland Premier League Season, Ferrymead Bays were pleased to announce that Danny Halligan would be the new manager at the club as of the 2014 season. Danny Halligan represented New Zealand at international level and he ended his international playing career with 36 international caps and five goals to his credit. Ferrymead finished the 2014 season as they did in 2013 finishing in 3rd place with 34 points with rivals Cashmere Technical winning their second consecutive Premier League title levelling Ferrymead's number of titles with four.

Notable former players 
 Greg Draper - The New Saints and New Zealand All Whites
 Ben Sigmund - Wellington Phoenix and New Zealand All Whites
 Glen Collins - The Football Kingz and New Zealand All Whites
 Joe Bell - Brøndby IF and New Zealand All Whites

Honours

League

Mainland Premier League: 5
2002, 2006, 2011, 2012, 2017

Cups

English Cup: 4
2009, 2012, 2013, 2016
South Island Football Championship: 1
2012

External links
Ferrymead Bays Official Website
Mainland Soccer - Club Page
NZ Clubs Database
New Zealand 2004/05 Season Results

Association football clubs in Christchurch
1972 establishments in New Zealand